The culture of the Purépecha people was polytheist.

List of some deities:

 Curicaveri - Sun god
 Cuerauáperi - Creation goddess
 Xarátanga - Water god
 Cuitzeo - War god
 Auicamine - Evil goddess
 Pehuame - Birth goddess (advocation of Cuerauáperi)
 Jurhiata - (advocation of Curicaveri)

References

:es:Imperio purépecha
:es:Cultura tarasca

Purépecha
Deities
Lists of deities